The Jasenovac Monastery is a Serbian Orthodox Monastery dedicated to the Nativity of Theotokos and St. John the Baptist. Belongs to Diocese of Slavonia, in Croatia.

History 
The Monastery was built in 1775.

During the beginning of WWII, the monastery was destroyed.

The monastery was restored and consecrated on September 2, 1984.

During war at disintegration of Yugoslavia in 1991, the church was partially damaged and in May 1995 during Operation Flash, the church was desecrated and destroyed.

In 2000, the church was restored by then the Bishop of Slavonia Sava Jurić proclaimed the Jasenovac Church of the Nativity Theotokos and St. John the Baptist as monastery.

The abbot of this monastery was Amfilohije Zivkovic.

Images

References

External links 

 Манастир Јасеновац
 Манастир Јасеновац eparhija-slavonska.com
 Manastir Jasenovac, IDENTITET broj 132., mart 2009

Serbian Orthodox monasteries in Croatia